Heideman is a German and Dutch surname. Notable people with the surname include:

Esther Heideman, American opera singer
Jan Maarten Heideman (born 1973), Dutch speed skater
Kathleen M Heideman, American poet and environmentalist
Mike Heideman (1948–2018), American basketball coach

See also
Heidemann